Ypsotingini is a cosmopolitan tribe of lace bugs. Seven genera have been recorded.

List of genera

Chorotingis Drake
Derephysia Spinola
Dictyonota Curtis
Dictyotingis Drake
Euaulana Drake
Kalama Puton
Ypsotingis Drake

References
 Froeschner, R.C., 2001. Lace Bug Genera of the World, II: Subfamily Tinginae: tribes Litadeini and Ypsotingini (Heteroptera: Tingidae). Smithsonian Contributions to Zoology, No. 611.
 Drake, C.J. & Ruhoff, F.A., 1960. Lace-bug genera of the world. (Hemiptera: Tingidae). Proc. U.S. Natl. Mus. 112 (3431): 1-105, 9 pls.
 Drake, C.J. & Ruhoff, F.A., 1965. Lace-bugs of the world: a catalogue. (Hemiptera: Tingidae). Bulletin of the United States National Museum: 243, 1-643.
 

Tingidae
Hemiptera tribes